The Focke-Wulf Fw 189 Uhu ("Eagle Owl") is a German twin-engine, twin-boom, three-seat tactical reconnaissance and army cooperation aircraft. It first flew in 1938 (Fw 189 V1), entered service in 1940 and was produced until mid-1944.

In addition, Focke-Wulf used this airframe in response to a tender request by the RLM for a dedicated ground-attack airplane, and later submitted an armored version for trials. However, the Henschel Hs 129 was selected instead.

Design and development
In 1937, the German Ministry of Aviation issued a specification for a short-range, three-seat reconnaissance aircraft with a good all-round view to support the German army in the field, replacing the Henschel Hs 126, which had just entered service. A power of about 850–900 hp (630–670 kW) was specified. The specification was issued to Arado and Focke-Wulf.  Arado's design, the Ar 198, which was initially the preferred option, was a relatively conventional single-engined high-wing monoplane with a glazed gondola under the fuselage. Focke-Wulf's chief designer Kurt Tank's design, the Fw 189, was a twin-boom design, powered by two Argus As 410 engines instead of the expected single engine. As a "twin-boom" design like the earlier Dutch Fokker G.I, the Fw 189 used a central crew gondola for its crew accommodation, which for the Fw 189 would be designed with a heavily glazed and framed "stepless" cockpit forward section, which used no separate windscreen panels for the pilot (as with many German medium bombers from 1938 onwards). Blohm & Voss proposed as a private venture something even more radical: chief designer Dr. Richard Vogt's unique asymmetric BV 141. Orders were placed for three prototypes each of the Arado and Focke-Wulf designs, in April 1937.

The Fw 189 had as part of its defensive armament, an innovative rear-gun emplacement designed by the Ikaria-Werke: a rotating conical rear "turret" of sorts, manually rotated with a metal-framed, glazed conical fairing streamlining its shape, with the open section providing the firing aperture for either a single or twin-mount machine gun at the unit's circular-section forward mount. The Fw 189 was produced in large numbers, at the Focke-Wulf factory in Bremen, at the Bordeaux-Merignac aircraft factory (Avions Marcel Bloch's factory, which became Dassault Aviation after the war) in occupied France, then in the Aero Vodochody aircraft factory in Prague, occupied Czechoslovakia. Total production was 864 aircraft of all variants.

Operational history
It was nicknamed  "Rama" ("frame" in the Russian, Ukrainian and Polish languages) by Soviet forces, referring to its distinctive tailboom and stabilizer shapes, giving it a quadrangular appearance. Despite its low speed and fragile looks, the Fw 189's manoeuvrability made it a difficult target for attacking Soviet fighters. The Fw 189 was often able to out-turn attacking fighters by flying in a tight circle into which enemy fighters could not follow.

Nocturnal reconnaissance and night fighter versions
Night Reconnaissance Group 15, attached to the 4th Panzerarmee in southern Poland during late 1944, carried out nocturnal reconnaissance and light bombing sorties with a handful of 189A-1s.  These planes typically lacked the main model's rear dorsal machine gun. Small numbers of A-1s were used as night fighters in the closing weeks of the war – the aircraft were modified by having their reconnaissance equipment removed and then fitted with FuG 212 AI radar in the nose and a single obliquely-firing 20mm MG FF autocannon in the common Schräge Musik upwards/forward-firing offensive fitment also used for heavier-airframed German night fighters, like the Bf 110G. For the Fw 189 the installation was in the crew nacelle in the space where the rear dorsal gun was normally housed.  The majority of the nachtjager 189s were operated by NJG 100, were based at Greifswald.  Chronic fuel shortages and enemy air superiority over the 189 defence area (chiefly Berlin) meant that few aircraft were shot down by these craft.

Variants
The main production model was the Fw 189A reconnaissance plane, built mostly in two variants, the A-1 and A-2. Unless otherwise stated all aircraft were powered by two Argus As 410 engines of 465 PS (459 hp, 342 kW).
 Fw 189 A-0: Ten preproduction aircraft for operational tests and trials.
 Fw 189 A-1: Initial production version, armed with two flexible 7.92 mm (.312 in) MG 15 machine guns in the dorsal and rear positions, one 7.92 mm (0.312 in) MG 17 machine gun in each wing root, plus four  bombs. It could carry an Rb 20/30 or an Rb 50/30 aerial camera.
 Fw 189 A-1 trop: Tropicalised version of the Fw 189 A-1, fitted with air intake filters and survival equipment. Conversion from A-1s.

 Fw 189 A-1/U2: VIP transport version of the Fw 189 A-1.
 Fw 189 A-1/U3: VIP transport version of the Fw 189 A-1.
 Fw 189 A-2: The flexible MG 15s were replaced by twin-barrel 7.92 mm (0.312 in) MG 81Z.
 Fw 189 A-3: Tropicalised production version of the Fw 189 A-2, fitted with air intake filters and survival equipment.
 Fw 189 A-4: Light ground-attack version, armed with two 20 mm MG 151/20 cannons in each wing root, fitted with armour protection for the underside of the fuselage, engines and fuel tanks. No production known.

The Fw 189B was a five-seat training aircraft; only 13 were built.
 Fw 189 B-0: Three preproduction aircraft.
 Fw 189 B-1: Five-seat training version. ten built.

The Fw 189C was conceived as a heavily armoured ground-attack, close-support variant, in competition with the Henschel Hs 129. But its two prototypes (V1b and V6) were not satisfactory, and it was not produced.
 Fw 189D: Proposed twin-float trainer floatplane. Not built.
 Fw 189E: Prototype only, powered by two 700 PS (690 hp, 515 kW) Gnome-Rhone 14M radial engines.
 Fw 189 F-1: Re-engined Fw 189 A-1 aircraft, powered by two 600 PS (592 hp, 441 kW) Argus As 411 engines.
 Fw 189 F-2: Fitted with electrically-operated landing gear, increased fuel capacity and additional armour plating, powered by two 600 PS (592 hp, 441 kW) Argus As 411 engines.

Operators

 Luftwaffe

 Bulgarian Air Force

 Royal Hungarian Air Force

 Royal Norwegian Air Force (Postwar)

 Royal Romanian Air Force

 Slovenské vzdušné zbrane
 Slovak Insurgent Air Force

Surviving aircraft
Fw 189 V7+1H (Werk Nr. 2100) is the only surviving Fw 189. It was part of 1./Nahaufklärungsgruppe 10, with V7 originally the Geschwaderkennung code for Heeres-Aufklärungsgruppe 32 based at Pontsalenjoki (due east of Kuusamo, and within the south-central area of modern Russia's Republic of Karelia) and took part in its first mission on 4 May 1943. Approximately 31 minutes after taking off V7+1H was attacked and damaged by Lend-Lease-acquired Soviet Hawker Hurricane fighters. The aircraft dived to escape the fighters, but, owing to the damage suffered, could not pull out in time and it struck the treetops. The tail was torn off and the crew nacelle left hanging upside down within the trees. The pilot, Lothar Mothes, survived but one crewman was killed in the crash and the third died from blood loss as a result of a severed leg. Mothes survived two weeks in sub-zero temperatures, evading Soviet patrols while eating bark and grubs as he walked back to his base. He spent the next nine months in a hospital recovering from severe frostbite before returning to the front line, eventually to fly another 100 missions.

In 1991 the wreckage of V7+1H was found in the Russian forest where it had remained for 48 years. The aircraft was purchased by a group of British aircraft enthusiasts and was shipped to the United Kingdom, arriving at Worthing, West Sussex in March 1992. The Focke Wulf 189 Restoration Society was formed to restore the aircraft to flying condition. Her former pilot, Lothar Mothes, met up again with his aircraft at the 1996 Biggin Hill Airshow.

It was reported that this aircraft was acquired by Paul Allen’s Flying Heritage Collection  and was in rebuild at Duxford to an airworthy condition, but as of August 1 2021 was listed for sale.

Specifications (Fw 189 A-1)

See also

References

Notes

Bibliography

 .
 .
 .
 .
 .
 .
 .
 .

External links

 .  Fw 189 V7+IH's final mission.
  including the radial-engined E model.
  for the Fw 189's rear gun turret.
 .  Focke Wulf Fw 189 owl historical video.
 .  Russian language, Soviet-produced recognition-training film on the Fw 189 reconnaissance aircraft.

Fw 189
1930s German military reconnaissance aircraft
World War II reconnaissance aircraft of Germany
Low-wing aircraft
Twin-boom aircraft
Aircraft first flown in 1941
Twin piston-engined tractor aircraft